Swarth Fell is an approximately 1 mile (1.5 km) stretch of high ground (consisting mainly of limestone capped with millstone grit) situated to the south of Wild Boar Fell, of which it is a continuation. It is mostly within Mallerstang, Cumbria, but the boundary between Cumbria and North Yorkshire (historically Westmorland and the West Riding of Yorkshire) runs along its length, just to the west of the highest points.

The summit, (681m, 2234 ft) which is marked by a cairn, and is listed as both a Hewitt and a Nuttall, lies 2.1 km to the south of the summit of Wild Boar Fell, the two fells being separated by a col - where there are several cairns, and a small unnamed tarn. (This small tarn can just be seen in the photograph above right). 

The name "Swarth" fell, like most of the names of geographical features in the area, is of Norse origin: svartr, dark in colour.

Approximately 1 km south-east of the summit is the fell's other high point, Swarth Fell Pike (651 m, 2136 ft).Baugh Fell, Yorkshire Dales, is 5.3 km to the south-west, separated from Swarth Fell by Grisedale.

Mountains and hills of North Yorkshire
Mountains and hills of Cumbria
Hewitts of England
Nuttalls
Mallerstang